Steyr Sportwaffen GmbH is an Austrian manufacturer of air guns (rifles and pistols) aimed mostly at competitive ISSF shooting events such as 10 m Air Pistol and 10 m Air Rifle contested at the Olympic Games as governed by the International Shooting Sport Federation (ISSF).

The company was formed as an offshoot of Steyr Mannlicher in 2001.

They are most well known for the Steyr LP10 pre-charged pneumatic air pistol that was used to win gold and silver medals in both the men's and women's 10 m Air Pistol at the 2004 Summer Olympics held in Athens, Greece.

In the Beijing 2008 Summer Olympics  All medals - gold, silver, bronze for the Women's event  and both Gold And Silver in the Men's event went to shooters using Steyr pistols

Products

Air Pistols
 Steyr LP 1
 Steyr LP 2
 Steyr LP 5
 Steyr LP 10
 Steyr LP 10 E
 Steyr LP 50
 Steyr LP 50 E
 Steyr LP S
 Steyr Evo 10
 Steyr Evo 10 E

Air Rifles
 Steyr LGB 1
 Steyr LG 110
 Steyr High Power hunting
 Steyr High Power

See also
Steyr Mannlicher from which Steyr Sportwaffen was formed.
10 m Air Pistol
10 m Air Rifle

External links
Official Site

Firearm manufacturers of Austria
Steyr
Economy of Lower Austria
Privately held companies of Austria